Devighat is one of the historical and religious place of Nuwakot District of Central development region in Nepal. It is located at 60 km north of Kathmandu. It is the death place and place of funeral of king Prithvi Narayan Shah.

The town is located at the junction of Trishuli River and Tadi River.

Religious site
 Jalapa Devi Mandir

Hydropower 
Devighat Hydropower station 14 MW
 Solar power Project

See also
Nuwakot, Bagmati
Bidur
Jiling Special Economic Zone
kakani

References

Populated places in Nuwakot District
Ghats of Nepal